Anatoliy Alekseevich Smirnov (11 November 1941 – 15 September 2022) was a Russian economist and politician. A member of the Communist Party of the Soviet Union, he served as chairman of the Yoshkar-Ola Executive Committee from 1981 to 1987.

Smirnov was a recipient of the Order of the Badge of Honour and also the Order of the Red Banner of Labour. He died in Yoshkar-Ola on 15 September 2022, at the age of 80.

References

1941 births
2022 deaths
Communist Party of the Soviet Union members
Recipients of the Order of the Red Banner of Labour
Soviet economists
Soviet politicians